Glauco Pellegrini (1919–1991) was an Italian screenwriter and film director.

Selected filmography
 Il monello della strada (1951)
 Shadows on the Grand Canal (1951)
 What Scoundrels Men Are! (1953)
 Ivan, Son of the White Devil (1953)
 Symphony of Love (1954)
 Mid-Century Loves (1954)
 The Most Wonderful Moment (1957)
 L'amore più bello (1958)

References

Bibliography
 Mitchell, Charles P. The Great Composers Portrayed on Film, 1913 through 2002. McFarland, 2004.

External links

1919 births
1991 deaths
Italian film directors
20th-century Italian screenwriters
Italian male screenwriters
People from Siena
20th-century Italian male writers